Iker Bilbao Mendiguren (born 20 March 1996) is a Spanish professional footballer who plays as a midfielder for Greek Super League club PAS Giannina.

Career
Bilbao was born in Larrabetzu, Biscay, Basque Country, and finished his formation with Danok Bat CF. On 5 July 2015, he moved to Athletic Bilbao and was assigned to the farm team in Tercera División.

Bilbao made his senior debut on 3 October 2015, starting in a 0–4 Tercera División away loss against Zalla UC. He scored his first senior goal late in the month, netting the opener in a 2–2 draw at SD Deusto.

On 18 August 2017, Bilbao was loaned to Segunda División B side Gernika Club, for one year. On 17 July of the following year, after featuring sparingly, he signed for fellow league team SD Amorebieta.

Initially a backup option, Bilbao became a starter in the 2020–21 campaign, featuring in 25 league matches (play-offs included) and scoring twice as his side achieved a first-ever promotion to Segunda División; one of his two goals was in a 1–0 away win over CD Badajoz, which sealed the club's promotion. He made his professional debut on 23 August 2021, coming on as a second-half substitute for Gorka Guruzeta in a 0–2 away loss against CD Mirandés.

On 28 June 2022, he signed for PAS Giannina a team in the city of Ioannina.

References

External links

1996 births
Living people
People from Greater Bilbao
Spanish footballers
Spanish expatriate footballers
Footballers from the Basque Country (autonomous community)
Association football defenders
Segunda División players
Segunda División B players
Tercera División players
Super League Greece players
Danok Bat CF players
CD Basconia footballers
Gernika Club footballers
SD Amorebieta footballers
PAS Giannina F.C. players
Spanish expatriate sportspeople in Greece
Expatriate footballers in Greece
Sportspeople from Biscay